Springdale is a town in Lexington County, South Carolina, United States. The population was 2,636 at the 2010 census. It is part of the Columbia Metropolitan Statistical Area.

Geography
Springdale is located at  (33.960952, -81.109895).

According to the United States Census Bureau, the town has a total area of 4.0 square miles (10.5 km2), of which 4.0 square miles (10.4 km2) is land and 0.04 square mile (0.1 km2) (0.74%) is water.

Demographics

As of the census of 2000, there were 2,877 people, 1,206 households, and 869 families residing in the town. The population density was 718.8 people per square mile (277.7/km2). There were 1,334 housing units at an average density of 333.3 per square mile (128.8/km2). The racial makeup of the town was 88.91% White, 7.75% African American, 0.66% Native American, 1.67% Asian, 0.24% from other races, and 0.76% from two or more races. Hispanic or Latino of any race were 0.70% of the population.

There were 1,206 households, out of which 26.0% had children under the age of 18 living with them, 58.0% were married couples living together, 10.5% had a female householder with no husband present, and 27.9% were non-families. 22.0% of all households were made up of individuals, and 9.9% had someone living alone who was 65 years of age or older. The average household size was 2.39 and the average family size was 2.77.

In the town, the population was spread out, with 19.8% under the age of 18, 7.7% from 18 to 24, 26.7% from 25 to 44, 26.8% from 45 to 64, and 19.1% who were 65 years of age or older. The median age was 42 years. For every 100 females, there were 91.3 males. For every 100 females age 18 and over, there were 90.6 males.

The median income for a household in the town was $48,456, and the median income for a family was $57,014. Males had a median income of $40,531 versus $26,658 for females. The per capita income for the town was $21,260. About 3.2% of families and 6.1% of the population were below the poverty line, including 5.8% of those under age 18 and 5.7% of those age 65 or over.

References

External links

Towns in Lexington County, South Carolina
Towns in South Carolina
Columbia metropolitan area (South Carolina)